Marceline Day (born Marceline Newlin; April 24, 1908 – February 16, 2000) was an American motion picture actress whose career began as a child in the 1910s and ended in the 1930s.

Early life
Marceline Newlin was born in Colorado Springs, Colorado and raised in Salt Lake City, Utah, the daughter of Frank and Irene Newlin and the younger sister of film actress Alice Day. She attended Venice High School.

Career
Day began her film career after her sister Alice Day became a featured actress as one of the Sennett Bathing Beauties in one and two-reel comedies for Keystone Studios. Day made her first film appearance with her sister in the 1924 Mack Sennett comedy Picking Peaches before being cast in a string of comedy shorts opposite actor Harry Langdon and a stint in early Hollywood Westerns opposite such silent film cowboy stars as Hoot Gibson, Art Acord and Jack Hoxie. Gradually, Day began appearing in more dramatic roles opposite such esteemed actors of the era as Lionel Barrymore, John Barrymore, Norman Kerry, Ramón Novarro, Buster Keaton, and Lon Chaney.

In 1926, Day was named one of the 13 WAMPAS Baby Stars, a promotional campaign sponsored by the Western Association of Motion Picture Advertisers in the United States, which honored 13 young women each year who they believed to be on the threshold of movie stardom. Other notable recipients that year were Joan Crawford, Mary Astor, Janet Gaynor, and Dolores del Río. The publicity from the campaign added to Day's popularity, and in 1927, she appeared opposite John Barrymore in the romantic adventure The Beloved Rogue.

Day is probably best recalled for her appearances in the now lost 1927 horror classic London After Midnight directed by Tod Browning with Lon Chaney and Conrad Nagel, her role as Sally Richards in the 1928 comedy The Cameraman with Buster Keaton, and the 1929 drama The Jazz Age with Douglas Fairbanks Jr. By the late 1920s, Day's career had eclipsed the career of her sister Alice, who also was a popular actress. The two would appear together onscreen again in the 1929 musical The Show of Shows.

She married furrier Arthur J. Klein in 1930. She was married for a second time in 1959 to John Arthur until his death on April 2, 1980. She had no children with either husband.

Although Day transitioned into sound films with little problem, her film roles gradually became lesser in quality, and she began working primarily for lower-rung film studios. By 1933, Day made the transition back to the Western genre, appearing in "B" Westerns starring Tim McCoy, Hoot Gibson, Ken Maynard, Jack Hoxie, and John Wayne. Her last film was The Fighting Parson with Gibson. After her retirement, Day rarely spoke of her years as an actress and never spoke to reporters or granted interviews.

Death
On February 16, 2000, Day was found dead in her kitchen, in her Cathedral City, California, home at the age of 91. She was cremated.

Filmography

Features

Shorts

References

External links

 
 Marceline Day at Silents Are Golden
 Marceline Day at Silent Era People
 Marceline Day at the New York Times Movies
 Marceline Day at Virtual History

American film actresses
American silent film actresses
Actresses from Colorado Springs, Colorado
Actresses from Salt Lake City
People from Cathedral City, California
1908 births
2000 deaths
Actresses from Colorado
20th-century American actresses
WAMPAS Baby Stars
Western (genre) film actresses
Venice High School (Los Angeles) alumni